Lady Gyeonghwa of the Jincheon Im clan was a Goryeo Royal Princess as the first and oldest daughter of King Hyejong and Queen Uihwa who became the second wife of her half uncle, King Gwangjong, which she then followed her maternal clan. As a Princess, she therefore was called as Princess Gyeonghwa or Grand Princess Gyeonghwa.

When Wang Gyu accused the King's half-brothers, Yo and So were plotted treason, the King then gave his eldest daughter to So as his 2nd wife and it was believed that they were married in 944. Meanwhile, her father's effort to safe his own life from the political treatment made she must married her uncle who had already secured his position in the royal family through his first marriage. Gyeonghwa's marriage with So was purely political marriage. However, due to her father's condition, despite she once held position as a Royal Princess, she did better known Gwangjong's "Madam" (부인, 夫人) rather than "Queen consort" (왕후, 王后) like Daemok, his first wife (formerly half younger sister).

In popular culture
Portrayed by Kim Min-kyung and Jang Han-na in the 2002–2003 KBS TV series The Dawn of the Empire.
Portrayed by Jang Seo-hee in the 2016 SBS TV series Moon Lovers: Scarlet Heart Ryeo.

References

External links
Lady Gyeonghwa on Encykorea (in Korean). Retrieved June 14, 2021.

Royal consorts of the Goryeo Dynasty
Goryeo princesses
Year of birth unknown
Year of death unknown